Nicole Nadel (born 12 June 2000) is an Israeli tennis player.

Nadel has a career-high WTA singles ranking of 707, achieved on 12 November 2018. She also has a career-high WTA doubles ranking of 872 achieved on 9 September 2019.

Nadel has represented Israel in Fed Cup, where she has a win-loss record of 0–1.

ITF Finals

Singles

Doubles

References

External links
 
 
 
 

2000 births
Living people
Israeli female tennis players
21st-century Israeli women